Mount Cleary is a summit that overlooks Pa Tio Tio Gap from the south. It was named after Peter Cleary, who has served with the Antarctic Division and Antarctica NZ since 1978; worked with New Zealand and United Kingdom programs as field assistant, dog handler, and in logistics support.

References
 

Mountains of Victoria Land
Scott Coast